The Homesman is a 2014 Western historical drama film set in the 1850s Midwest and directed by Tommy Lee Jones. The screenplay by Jones, Kieran Fitzgerald, and Wesley Oliver is based on the 1988 novel of the same name by Glendon Swarthout. The film stars Jones and Hilary Swank and also features Meryl Streep, Grace Gummer, Miranda Otto, Hailee Steinfeld, John Lithgow, Jesse Plemons, and James Spader.

The film was selected to compete for the Palme d'Or in the main competition section at the 2014 Cannes Film Festival and received a North American limited release on November 14, 2014, by Roadside Attractions. The Homesman has received mostly positive reviews from critics. Rotten Tomatoes gave the film a rating average of 7.1/10.

The title refers to the task of taking immigrants back home, which was typically a man's job.

Plot
In 1854, Mary Bee Cuddy is a 31-year-old spinster from New York, a former teacher who journeyed to the Midwest for more opportunity. She is an active member of the small farming community of Loup in the Nebraska Territory and has significant financial prospects and sizable land ownership. She seems strong and independent but suffers from depression and feels isolated. She makes dinner for her neighbor Bob Giffen and sings to him, but when she proposes, he turns her down, saying she is plain-looking and too bossy. He leaves to find a wife back east.

After a harsh winter, three women from the community show signs of mental instability due to the hardships they have faced. Arabella Sours loses three children to diphtheria, Theoline Belknap kills her own child after a poor harvest puts her family at risk of starvation, and Gro Svendsen, a Danish immigrant, is in an abusive relationship with her husband and breaks down after her mother dies. Reverend Dowd calls upon one of their husbands to escort the women eastward to a church in Hebron, Iowa that cares for the mentally ill. Mr. Belknap refuses to participate in the lottery to determine who will escort the women; Cuddy takes his place, and the lot falls on her.

While preparing for her journey, Cuddy encounters George Briggs, a claim jumper, who has been left on horseback with a noose around his neck for stealing Bob Giffen's land while he is away. Scared to make the trip alone, she frees him, and in return demands his help escorting the women. He immediately casts doubt on the job and insists he be free to abandon her at any time. To persuade him, Cuddy tells him that she is mailing $300 to await his arrival in Iowa, but she secretly keeps it with her.

Briggs's experience comes in handy when the group crosses paths with hostile Pawnee, and he is able to bribe them by giving up Dorothy, Cuddy's horse. Later, when Arabella is kidnapped by a freighter, Briggs gives chase, and the two men scuffle before Arabella kills her kidnapper. Eventually the caravan comes across the grave of an 11-year-old girl that has been desecrated by Indians, and Cuddy insists they stop and restore it. Briggs vows to push on, so Cuddy stays behind and agrees to catch up with him. After restoring the grave, Cuddy sets out on horseback. However, she loses her way, and after riding all night discovers that she has gone in a circle, and her horse has led her back to the grave.

Finally catching up to Briggs after another night of riding, Cuddy, distraught over having to wander the prairie, suggests they marry. Briggs, like all the previous men, rejects Cuddy, calling her "plain" and saying he "ain't no farmer" and is only along for the promised reward. Later that night, a naked Cuddy propositions him, and despite his initial protestations, the two have sex. Rising late the next morning, Briggs finds that Cuddy has hanged herself. Briggs chastises Sours, Belknap and Svendsen, blaming their illness for Cuddy's death as he buries her body. He discovers that she had kept the $300 with her the entire time, and so takes a horse and abandons the three women. However, the trio follow him on foot, and Arabella almost drowns while chasing him across a river. Briggs saves her and decides to go on to Iowa.

Briggs seeks food and shelter at an empty hotel belonging to Irishman Aloysius Duffy, who informs him that they have no rooms available for the caravan as a group of 16 investors are expected shortly, and the women would sour the establishment. Briggs lashes out at Duffy, whose men pull out guns of their own, resulting in a brief stand-off. Briggs leaves, but returns that night alone on horseback. He sends away the young cook, sets the hotel on fire and shoots Duffy in the foot. Briggs takes a suckling pig to feed himself and the women and leaves all inside the hotel to be burned alive.

Briggs reaches Hebron, passing the women into the care of Altha Carter, the wife of the church's reverend. He informs her of Cuddy's death but does not disclose the true cause. Guilty about having rejected Mary Bee's proposal, he has a wooden slab engraved with her name and plans to mark her grave with it. He discovers that his $300 is worthless, as the Bank of Loup has failed since they left. He gives a pair of shoes to Tabitha Hutchinson, a hard-working young maid at the hotel where he is staying, and then proposes to her, after advising her not to marry some young man going west, but to stay in town. She replies, "Maybe." He then boards the open-decked river ferry heading back west, where he sings a rowdy song with two musicians on deck. Briggs fires his pistol and shouts at people on the pier who complain about the noise. Eventually, one of the bargemen kicks Mary Bee's grave marker off the edge of the deck into the river, and unnoticed by Briggs, it slips underwater.

Cast

 Tommy Lee Jones as George Briggs
 Hilary Swank as Mary Bee Cuddy
 Grace Gummer as Arabella Sours
 Miranda Otto as Theoline Belknapp
 Sonja Richter as Gro Svendsen
 Meryl Streep as Altha Carter
 John Lithgow as Reverend Dowd
 James Spader as Aloysius Duffy
 Hailee Steinfeld as Tabitha Hutchinson
 Caroline Lagerfelt as Netti Nordstog
 Tim Blake Nelson as The Freighter
 Jesse Plemons as Garn Sours
 William Fichtner as Vester Belknap
 David Dencik as Thor Svendsen
 Barry Corbin as Buster Shaver
 Evan Jones as Bob Giffen
 Jo Harvey Allen as Mrs. Polhemus
 Karen Jones as Mrs. Linens

Themes
The film shows the unsparingly harsh and difficult life of early settlers of the American Midwest in the 1850s. The Homesman has been called a "feminist western". Critics have noted that the lives of women during this time are rarely explored, as opposed to men, while also commenting that women today are still having to balance many roles including the societal pressures for women to be married and have children and to be perfect wives and mothers.

Score
The music by Marco Beltrami has received praise from critics. The score emphasizes the use of wind sounds to show how early settlers had to endure the constant wind without solid shelter, which imitates the character themes of being mentally undone by the elements that surround them. Beltrami used inventive measures such as using a "wind piano" and recording outside. Beltrami said the goal was to take the "warmth" out of the sound to dissipate the air.

Release

The Homesman premiered on May 18, 2014, in competition at the 2014 Cannes Film Festival. The film also was screened at the 2014 Telluride Film Festival, and the AFI Film Festival, among others. Saban Films bought the film after Cannes for release, with Roadside Attractions joining to distribute the film in the U.S. EuropaCorp will distribute abroad. The film was limited-released in the United States on November 7, 2014, with plans to expand over following months.

Critical response
The Homesman has received mostly positive reviews from critics, with particulars standing out being Swank's performance, the cinematography, score, and costumes. Rotten Tomatoes gave the film an 81% approval rating based on 148 reviews, with a rating average of 7.1/10. The site's consensus: "A squarely traditional yet somewhat progressive Western, The Homesman adds another absorbing entry to Tommy Lee Jones' directorial résumé". Metacritic gave the film a score of 68/100 based on 43 critics, indicating generally favorable reviews.

Betsy Sharkey with the Los Angeles Times wrote: "Swank and Jones, in particular, are a very good odd couple, playing saint and sinner, sometimes reversing the roles. What the directing side of Jones does best is to cede the spotlight to his star. He builds a strong platform for Swank to take on yet another woman who refuses to be bound by gender conventions".

Andrew O'Hehir with Salon wrote: "Swank gives a magnificent performance as a woman whose calm and capable exterior cannot completely conceal her worsening desperation. In its unsentimental poetry, its stripped-down imagery and its unforgettable lead performances, 'The Homesman' is a ruthless western classic ... cinematographer Rodrigo Prieto’s harsh, horizontal landscapes—like the haunting, unsettling score by Marco Beltrami—are anything but picturesque and reassuring, and serve to support a strikingly bleak portrait of life on the 19th-century American frontier".

Claudia Puig with USA Today wrote: "Set on the Great Plains in the mid-1800s, 'The Homesman' aims for a story that's poignant and told sparely, but comes across as mawkish, tedious and self-indulgent. Swank brings a gravitas to her character that is undermined when some of her antics are played for laughs. In a 10-minute cameo, Meryl Streep's character is more fully developed than any of the leads' roles. The story attempts to show how hard it was for women in the Old West, but it ends up being Jones' surly show".

Accolades

References

External links
 
 
 
 

2014 films
2014 Western (genre) films
English-language French films
French Western (genre) films
American Western (genre) films
2010s English-language films
Films scored by Marco Beltrami
Films directed by Tommy Lee Jones
Films produced by Luc Besson
Films set in 1855
Films set in Nebraska
Films shot in New Mexico
Films shot in Georgia (U.S. state)
EuropaCorp films
2014 drama films
Films based on American novels
2010s American films
2010s French films